The Deutschland Cup is an in-season international ice hockey tournament hosted by the German Ice Hockey Federation which has been contested in most years since 1987.

Early years (1987–1997)
In 1987, the German Ice Hockey Federation created the Deutschland Cup as an official international tournament. Stuttgart served as a site for the first years of the tournament, with at least one game taking place in the Baden-Württemberg capital every year through 1996, except 1991, when the tournament was played at the Eissporthalle Frankfurt. Ulm, Bietigheim and Pforzheim in 1993 and Pforzheim and Neu-Ulm in 1994 also served as tournament sites.

Over the years, the tournament format has changed frequently. At first, the tournament featured three teams, and then as of the second year, four teams, in a round-robin format to determine a winner. At its peak in the mid-1990s, the tournament consisted of an opening round with two groups and a final round where overall placings were determined. In 1997, was played in München and Füssen.

Along with host Germany, the most important prominent teams took part in the early years, such as Czechoslovakia, and later the Czech Republic and Slovakia, various representatives from the Soviet Union and Russia, as well as Sweden, Finland and Canada. The 1991 edition was the last tournament for the Soviet Union national team—which came out the winner—before its final dissolution. In conjunction with the establishment of the new top division Deutsche Eishockey Liga, a DEL All-Star Team also took part in 1994.

Re-establishment (since 2000)
In anticipation of the 2001 IIHF World Championships in Germany, the tournament returned from its two-year hiatus in order to serve as a test run for the upcoming major event. The TUI Arena in Hanover, built for Expo 2000, established itself as a site for the tournament over the following years, and the new multipurpose arenas such as the Color Line Arena in Hamburg in 2004 and the SAP Arena in Mannheim in 2005 also were given the opportunity to host international tournaments for the first time. To emphasize the close cooperation with ongoing participant Switzerland, the opening games of the 2004 tournament as well as the renamed TUI Nations Cup in 2005 took place on Swiss ice, namely at the Bodensee-Arena in Kreuzlingen and at the Zurich Hallenstadion, respectively. In 2006, the tournament returned to its old name of Deutschland Cup. In 2008, the tournament started taking place in Mannheim and Frankfurt. From 2009 to 2014, the tournament took place at Olympiahalle in Munich.

The usual entries in the tournament at the start of the 21st century, in addition to the hosts Germany and Switzerland, were notably Slovakia, Canada, as well as the US National Team, the latter two, however, mainly made up of players stationed in European leagues and not in the North American National Hockey League.

In 2015, it was announced that the tournament would move from Munich to Augsburg at the Curt Frenzel Stadium.

From 2018 on, the tournament will be held in Krefeld.

Past winners

References

External links
Official website

 
Ice hockey tournaments in Europe
International ice hockey competitions hosted by Germany